Bagisara is a genus of moths of the monotypic subfamily Bagisarinae of the family Noctuidae. It is found mainly in North America and the Amazon rainforest.

Species
 Bagisara albicosta Schaus, 1911
 Bagisara avangareza Schaus, 1911
 Bagisara brouana Ferguson, 1997
 Bagisara buxea Grote, 1881
 Bagisara demura Dyar, 1913
 Bagisara graphicomas Dyar, 1922
 Bagisara gulnare Strecker, 1878
 Bagisara laverna Druce, 1889
 Bagisara lulua Schaus, 1921
 Bagisara malacha Druce, 1889
 Bagisara obscura Hampson, 1910
 Bagisara oula Dyar, 1913
 Bagisara pacifica Schaus, 1911
 Bagisara patula Druce, 1898
 Bagisara paulensis Schaus, 1898
 Bagisara praecelsa Ferguson, 1997
 Bagisara rectifascia Grote, 1874
 Bagisara repanda (Fabricius, 1793)
 Bagisara tristicta Hampson, 1898
 Bagisara xan Dyar, 1913

References

 Bagisara at Markku Savela's Lepidoptera and Some Other Life Forms
 
 Natural History Museum Lepidoptera genus database

Bagisarinae